Total Divas is an American reality television series that aired from July 28, 2013, to December 10, 2019, on E!. The series gave viewers an inside look into the lives of female WWE wrestlers from their work within WWE to their personal lives with the inclusion of behind the scenes footage. Seasons one through nine are available on WWE's on-demand streaming service, WWE Network, Hulu and Peacock.

Production and casting 

Total Divas was revealed in May 2013, as a part of a partnership with E!. The cast for the newly announced series comprised Brie and Nikki Bella, Naomi, Cameron, Natalya, Eva Marie, and JoJo. It was announced on August 14, 2013, that E! had ordered an additional six episodes to the already eight episode first season, bringing the total episode number up to fourteen episodes. The mid-season finale aired on September 15, 2013, with the season continuing on November 10, 2013. WWE commentator Josh Mathews revealed on November 20, 2013, that Total Divas had been renewed for a second season. The second season premiered on March 16, 2014, with Summer Rae joining the cast, replacing JoJo as she decided to focus more on wrestling.

On May 19, 2014, E! announced that the third season of Total Divas would premiere on September 7, 2014, with Rosa Mendes joining the cast. On February 24, 2015, Paige announced Total Divas was renewed for a fourth season, with filming commencing at the end of the month. It was then announced at the end of season three, that the fourth season would premiere on July 7, 2015, moving from Sunday to Tuesday nights. On April 1, 2015, E! announced the show had been renewed for a fourth season via a press release. In the press release, it was confirmed that Naomi would return as a series regular with Cameron and Rosa Mendes being removed from the main cast. All of the other Divas would return as series regulars. After the September 22 episode of Total Divas aired, it was announced that the following week's episode would serve as the season finale, rather than a mid-season finale.

Season 5 was announced on October 6, 2015, and premiered on January 19, 2016, with the fourth season's main cast with the exception of Naomi returning. It was subsequently announced that WWE Tough Enough runner-up Mandy Rose would be joining the show as a series regular and that Rosa Mendes would be rejoining the main cast. Season 6 was officially confirmed on April 18, 2016, by the E! Network with a fall premiere date and the majority of last season's cast returning, along with Naomi rejoining the show as a series regular, and Lana, Maryse and Renee Young replacing Alicia Fox, Mandy Rose and Rosa Mendes. Additionally, the E! Network announced that Brie and Nikki would be getting their own spin-off also with a fall premiere date, titled Total Bellas.

On January 28, 2017, it was announced that Nikki Bella will serve as an executive producer of the show when the series returns in April 2017. In May 2017, it was announced that Eva Marie would not be returning as a series regular. On June 9, 2017, it was reported that Alexa Bliss and Nia Jax would be joining the upcoming season of Total Divas. On June 10, 2017, Renee Young confirmed via Twitter that she will not be returning for the seventh season. Lana confirmed in an interview that she was returning to the show for its seventh season along with her storyline of becoming a singles competitor. On June 29, 2017, it was reported that Carmella would be joining the cast and that Paige wouldn't be returning for the upcoming season. On September 20, 2017, E! revealed that the seventh season will premiere on November 1, 2017.

On May 7, 2018, E! and WWE announced that Total Divas had been renewed for seasons 8 and 9. Season 8 is expected to air in fall 2018. On May 15, 2018, it was announced that Carmella would not be returning for the show's eighth season. On July 26, 2018, it was announced that season 8 would premiere on September 19, 2018, and the cast was to comprise Brie and Nikki Bella, Naomi, Natalya, Lana, Nia Jax and Paige.

In April 2019, Brie and Nikki Bella announced that they would not be returning for the ninth season of Total Divas, stating that they wanted to focus solely on Total Bellas. On August 26, 2019, it was revealed that Naomi, Natalya, and Nia Jax were set to return for season nine alongside Carmella, who was announced to be returning as a series regular, and new cast members Ronda Rousey and Sonya Deville. Additionally, Brie and Nikki Bella were reported to continue making guest appearances throughout the season. The ninth season premiered on October 1, 2019.

In June 2021, Essentially Sports reported that the E! Network had cancelled Total Divas and its sister show Total Bellas, citing low ratings and a lack of interest from those involved.

Timeline 

Cast notes

Episodes

Awards and nominations

Reception

Ratings 
The series premiered on July 28, 2013, drawing 1.34 million viewers. It would remain the highest rated season premiere throughout its run. The highest rated episode of the series was "Planet Funk is Funked Up" during the first season, garnering 1.67 million viewers. The lowest rated episode of the series was "MountainMania" during the ninth season, which only garnered a 0.19 in the ratings. The season two premiere episode "New Diva On The Block" received 1.07 million viewers. The following episode "The Braniel Bus" had a strong rise in viewers garnering 1.28 million viewers. The season three premiere attracted over 1.2 million viewers and 821K Adults 18–49, the series was up +15% and +17% respectively versus the season 2 premiere, as well as garnered 26,000 tweets and ranked as the #1 ad-supported cable program of the night. The third-season premiere of Total Divas outdrew the previous season's opener. The ninth season premiere episode pulled in a 0.25 rating, with the finale garnering a 0.22. This resulted in the cancellation of the show.

Critical response 
Tom Conroy of Media Life Magazine found the premiere "not very interesting", adding that it "feels real-ish" but "if the stars are doing any damage to their reputations, it's that they appear to be too nice. That might make their fans happy, but viewers expecting a smackdown can and will go elsewhere." Diva-Dirt.com stated "Meet Your New Guilty Pleasure!". Eric Gargiulo of Camel Clutch Blog said "I tuned in to WWE Total Divas expecting to see a scripted reality show in the vein of Hogan Knows Best. Instead I got an interesting look behind the scenes of the WWE and its superstars more in the same vein as Beyond the Mat."

References

External links 

 
 

 
2013 American television series debuts
2019 American television series endings
2010s American reality television series
English-language television shows
Television series by Bunim/Murray Productions
E! original programming